Idan Toklomety Gorno (born 9 August 2004) is an Israeli professional footballer who plays as a winger for Maccabi Petah Tikva and the Israel national under-19 team.

Early life 
Toklomety was born in Netanya, Israel. His father, Tony Toklomety, is a Beninese former professional footballer, who played for Maccabi Netanya and the Benin national football team. His mother, Iris Gorno, is an Israeli journalist.

Toklomety started his career when he was eight years old and joined the youth setup of Beitar Nes Tubruk. In 2021, Toklomety moved to the youth side of Maccabi Petah Tikva.

Club career

Maccabi Petah Tikva
Toklomety made his senior debut for Maccabi Petah Tikva on 23 April 2022, in a 0–4 loss against Hapoel Nof HaGalil for the Israeli Premier League.

International career
Toklomety plays for both the Israel national under-19 football team and the Israel national under-21 football team. He was a part of the Isarel squad that finished runner-up in the 2022 UEFA European Under-19 Championship. Due to his heritage, Toklomety has dual Israeli-Beninese citizenship, and is eligible to play for Benin and Israel.

Career statistics

Club

References

External links 
 

2004 births
Living people
Israeli footballers
Maccabi Petah Tikva F.C. players
Israeli Premier League players
Footballers from Netanya
21st-century Israeli people
Israeli people of African descent
Israel youth international footballers
Association football forwards
Israeli people of Beninese descent
Israeli people of Libyan-Jewish descent
African diaspora in Israel
Israeli
African
Middle Eastern people of African descent
Israeli